Juanma is a Spanish nickname which is short for "Juan Manuel". Notable people include:

Juanma Bajo Ulloa (born 1967), Spanish film director
Juanma (footballer, born 1980), full name Juan Manuel Barrero Barrero, former Spanish football goalkeeper
Juanma (footballer, born 1990), full name Juan Manuel Delgado Lloria, Spanish football forward
Juanma (footballer, born 1977), full name Juan Manuel Delgado Moreno, former Spanish football defender
Juanma (footballer, born 1984), full name Juan Manuel Espinosa Valenzuela, Spanish football midfielder
Juan Manuel Gárate Cepa (born 1976), Spanish cyclist
Juanma (footballer, born 1993), full name Juan Manuel García García, Spanish football forward
Juanma (footballer, born 1981), full name Juan Manuel Gómez Sánchez, Spanish football midfielder
Juanma (footballer, born 1986), full name Juan Manuel Hernández Sánchez, Spanish football midfielder
Juan Manuel Lillo (born 1965), Spanish football manager
Juan Manuel López (born 1983), Puerto Rican professional boxer
Juan Manuel López Iturriaga (born 1959), former Spanish basketball player
Juan Manuel López (footballer) (born 1969), former Spanish football defender
Juanma (footballer, born 1982), full name Juan Manuel Marrero Monzón, Spanish football midfielder
Juanma Ortiz (born 1982), Spanish football midfielder
Juanma Suárez (1960–1992), Spanish punk rock musician
Juanma (footballer, born 1978), full name Juan Manuel Valero Martínez, former Spanish football defender